Polycrown was a  cargo ship which was built by William Doxford & Sons, Sunderland in 1943 as Empire Beauty. Postwar she was sold into merchant service as Polycrown and saw further service as Ioannis Aspiotis and Laurel before she was scrapped in 1969.

Description
Empire Beauty was built by William Doxford & Sons, Sunderland. She was yard number 703.  Empire Beauty was launched on 8 April 1943 and completed in July that year. She had a GRT of 7,297, NRT of 4,936 and DWT of 10,270.

Career

Empire Beauty was built for the Ministry of War Transport (MoWT) and placed under the management of Stephens, Sutton Ltd. Empire Beauty was a member of a number of convoys during the Second World War.

SL 167
Convoy SL 167 sailed from Freetown, Sierra Leone on 9 August 1944 and arrived at Liverpool on 29 October 1944. Empire Beauty was carrying a cargo of Linseed.

KMS 65
Convoy KMS 65 sailed from Liverpool on 4 October 1944 and arrived at Gibraltar on 11 October 1944. Empire Beauty was carrying a cargo of stores and was bound for Port Said, Egypt, Basra, Iraq and Bandar Mashur, Iran.

In June 1946, Empire Beauty was sold to Einar Rasmussen, Kristiansand, Norway  and renamed Polycrown. She was placed under the management of Kristiansands Tankrederi A/S. In 1962, Polycrown was sold to Lamda Shipping Enterprises Corporation, Beirut, Lebanon and renamed Ioannis Aspiotis. In 1968, Ioannis Aspiotis was sold to Laurel Shipping Co Ltd, Famagusta, Cyprus and renamed Laurel. Later that year she was sold to shipbreakers at Kaohsiung, Taiwan, where she arrived for scrapping on 23 December 1968.

Official Numbers and Code Letters

Official numbers were a forerunner to IMO Numbers. Empire Beauty had the UK Official Number 169119 and used the Code Letters BFJG. Polycrown used the Code Letters LLKP.

Propulsion

The ship was propelled by a 3-cylinder SCSA oil engine which had cylinders of 23 in (60 cm) diameter by 91 in (232 cm) stroke. It was built by William Doxford & Sons.

References

External links
 Photo of MV Polycrown

1943 ships
Ships built on the River Wear
Empire ships
Ministry of War Transport ships
Merchant ships of the United Kingdom
Merchant ships of Norway
Merchant ships of Lebanon
Merchant ships of Cyprus